Phalonidia mesomerista is a species of moth of the family Tortricidae. It is found in Ecuador in the provinces of Napo and Carchi.

References

Moths described in 1994
Phalonidia